Spain competed at the 1952 Winter Olympics in Oslo, Norway.

Alpine skiing

Men

References

 Olympic Winter Games 1952, full results by sports-reference.com

Nations at the 1952 Winter Olympics
1952
Olympics